The Renshaw Baronetcy, of Coldharbour in Wivelsfield in the County of Sussex, is a title in the Baronetage of the United Kingdom. It was created on 7 January 1903 for Charles Renshaw, Unionist Party for Renfrewshire West from 1892 to 1906 and later Chairman of the Caledonian Railway Company. Sir David Renshaw, the fourth Baronet, is a member of the Executive Committee of the Standing Council of the Baronetage.

Renshaw baronets, of Coldharbour (1903)
Sir Charles Bine Renshaw, 1st Baronet (1848–1918)
Sir (Charles) Stephen Bine Renshaw, 2nd Baronet (1883–1976)
Sir (Charles) Maurice Bine Renshaw, 3rd Baronet (1912–2002)
Sir (John) David Bine Renshaw, 4th Baronet (born 1945)

Notes

References
Kidd, Charles, Williamson, David (editors). Debrett's Peerage and Baronetage (1990 edition). New York: St Martin's Press, 1990, 

Official roll of the Baronetage

External links
Short biography of Sir Charles Renshaw, 1st Baronet

Baronetcies in the Baronetage of the United Kingdom